Pōkākā is a Māori word meaning "storm", and may refer to:

Pōkākā or Elaeocarpus hookerianus, a native forest tree of New Zealand
Pokaka, New Zealand, a small township in New Zealand